Dumalinao, officially the Municipality of Dumalinao (Subanen: Benwa Dumalinao; Chavacano: Municipalidad de Dumalinao), is a 4th class municipality in the province of Zamboanga del Sur, Philippines. According to the 2020 census, it has a population of 32,928 people.

History 
In 1956, the barrios of Dumalinao Proper, Bigong, Tigbao, Ticwas, Bulongating, Baguitan, Pantad, Napulan, Tagulo, Camanga, Margang, Sibucao, Tina, Guling, Miculong, Baga, Rebucon, and Mambilik were separated from Pagadian and constituted into Dumalinao through House Bill No. 5000, which later became Republic Act No. 1593 and approved on June 16, 1956. The person responsible for sponsoring the bill was Congressman Alberto Q. Ubay of Zamboanga del Norte since during that time, Zamboanga del Sur had no congressman; Rep. Roseller T. Lim that time had been elected to the Senate in the 1955 special election.

Martin D. Raluto was first appointed municipal mayor with Guillermo Talaid as his vice mayor. The new town then had four councilors: Vicente T. Labrado, Severino Ramas, Fulgencio Lauglaug, and Eniiego Gemina, although the latter did not serve. Raluto held the position of municipal mayor until his death on June 11, 1969.

Geography

Barangays
Dumalinao is politically subdivided into 30 barangays.

Climate

Demographics

Economy 

Agriculture is the main economic activity as well as the number one source of livelihood of the people, although Dumalinao is a coastal town. The town is one of the major rice granaries of Zamboanga del Sur as 5,998 hectares of the land area is devoted to agricultural production. The crops planted on these lands include rice, corn, coconut, banana, and root crops. Corn, in particular, is the municipality's main agricultural crop. An estimated 2,837 hectares of the land are utilized for corn production, with an average of 30 ca-vans per hectare (or 8.5 million kilos annually). On top of that, Dumalinao's climate is very conducive for growing corn, so much so that farmers usually get to have two croppings of corn per year. An estimated value of Php 51 million comes from the annual production of corn.

Local Government

References

External links
 Dumalinao Profile at PhilAtlas.com
 [ Philippine Standard Geographic Code]
Philippine Census Information
Zambonga del Sur Official Website: Dumalinao (retrieved: 7 April 2009)

Municipalities of Zamboanga del Sur